Özhan is both a given name and surname. Notable people with the name include:

 Ahmet Özhan (born 1950), Turkish singer
 Özhan Canaydın (1943–2010), Turkish businessman and basketballer 
 Özhan Öztürk (born 1968), Turkish writer and researcher

Turkish-language surnames
Turkish masculine given names